Amantis longipennis is a species of praying mantis native to Vietnam.

References

longipennis
Insects of Vietnam
Mantodea of Southeast Asia
Insects described in 1930